Sverre Bergli (born 3 May 1926) is a Norwegian cinematographer.

He was born in Kongsberg. Among his films are Ut av mørket from 1958, Bussen from 1961, and Bør Børson Jr. from 1973. He later worked for the Norwegian Broadcasting Corporation.

Selected filmography
 1952: Vi vil skilles
 1954: Kasserer Jensen
 1957: Slalåm under himmelen
 1958: Ut av mørket
 1959: 5 loddrett
 1961: Bussen
 1961: Sønner av Norge
 1961: Et øye på hver finger
 1968: Snow Treasure
 1973: Bør Børson Jr.

References

External links

1926 births
Living people
People from Kongsberg
Norwegian cinematographers
NRK people